Richard Milo Clark (born July 29, 1964) is a lieutenant general in the United States Air Force (USAF), currently serving as the 21st Superintendent of the United States Air Force Academy. He previously served as Deputy Chief of Staff for Strategic Deterrence and Nuclear Integration. A bomber pilot, he graduated from the Air Force Academy in 1986.

Early life and education
From Richmond, Virginia, Richard Milo Clark graduated from Jefferson-Huguenot-Wythe High School, where he was an All-Metro offensive lineman in football and also stood out in track and field. Originally committed to play at William & Mary in Williamsburg, he took an interest in the United States Air Force Academy during his senior year, was accepted, and graduated in 1986 with a Bachelor of Science in Management. As a cadet, he was a four-year letterman on the football team at linebacker. During his senior season in 1985, the Falcons went 12–1 and were eighth in the final AP poll.

In 1991, Clark was named a distinguished graduate from Squadron Officer School at Maxwell Air Force Base and, in 1994, he received a Master of Arts in human resource development at Webster University. In 1996, he attended the USAF Weapons School, then at Ellsworth AFB, and in 1998 he was again a distinguished graduate at the Naval War College and married his wife, Amy, shortly after. The University of Maryland awarded him an honorary doctorate.

Military career
Clark is a command pilot, with more than 4,200 combined hours in the B-1 Lancer, EC-135 Looking Glass, KC-135 Stratotanker, T-1 Jayhawk, T-38 Talon, T-6 Texan II, and Learjet C-21. Four hundred of his flight hours have been in combat, and he received the Distinguished Flying Cross for extraordinary achievement and courage in the Global War on Terror. His initial flying assignment after pilot training was the Looking Glass in 1988 at Offutt AFB, then moved to the B-1 in 1991 at McConnell AFB.

From 2010 to 2012, Clark served as the Commandant of Cadets at the United States Air Force Academy. In 2016, Clark took command of the Third Air Force at Ramstein Air Base, Germany, and in 2018, he was named Deputy Air Force Chief of Staff for Strategic Deterrence and Nuclear Integration.

In July 2020, U.S. president Donald Trump nominated Clark to become the next Superintendent of the United States Air Force Academy, succeeding Jay Silveria. He began his duties on September 23, becoming the first black Superintendent to lead the institution.

Effective dates of promotions

References

1964 births
Living people
Military personnel from Richmond, Virginia
Recipients of the Air Force Distinguished Service Medal
Recipients of the Defense Superior Service Medal
Recipients of the Distinguished Flying Cross (United States)
Recipients of the Legion of Merit
United States Air Force Academy alumni
United States Air Force generals
United States Air Force Academy faculty
United States Air Force Academy people
United States Air Force personnel of the Gulf War
United States Air Force personnel of the Iraq War
United States Air Force personnel of the War in Afghanistan (2001–2021)